Wetu Telu ("three times") is a sect of Islamic beliefs of the Sasak people of Lombok, Indonesia. Practitioners pray three times a day, it differs from orthodox Sunni Islam called Waktu Lima, that pray five times a day. Adherents of Wetu Telu also only practice three of the Five Pillars of Islam, which are Shahada (Declaration of Faith), Salah (Prayer), and Sawm (Fasting). These practices can be represented by Kyai as religious leader of the community. Wetu Telu also incorporate some native beliefs of ancestral worship and animism.

References

Works cited

 
 
 
 
 

Religion in Lombok
Islam in Indonesia